The Basic Military Training Centre (BMTC) is a military training facility of the Singapore Armed Forces (SAF). It comprises five schools organised into three camps, of which two are based on Pulau Tekong, an island off the northeast coast of mainland Singapore, while the third camp is in Kranji in northwest Singapore. As its name indicates, it provides basic military training for the majority of recruits enlisted in the SAF.

Overview 
BMTC has five schools organised into three camps. Ladang Camp (BTMC Schools I, II and III) and Rocky Hill Camp (BTMC School IV) are on Pulau Tekong. BTMC School V is at Kranji Camp II. Each BMTC School is further subdivided into Companies.

Access to Pulau Tekong and Kranji Camp II requires prior approval from the Ministry of Defence. There are ferry services between Pulau Tekong and the Singapore Armed Forces Ferry Terminal (SAFFT) at Changi on mainland Singapore. Next to the ferry terminal is the National Service Landmark, a life-sized statue of a soldier bearing the Singapore Armed Forces flag.

BMTC is equipped with various facilities, including a five-storey housing block for each company, as well as sports facilities such as running tracks, indoor gyms and swimming pools, and supporting amenities such as cookhouses, canteens, medical centres and e-marts. On the training grounds, there are training sheds, a firing range simulator, as well as rifle, grenade and battle inoculation course ranges. All buildings in Ladang Camp are connected by sheltered walkways. The Tekong Highway located north of Ladang Camp leads to Rocky Hill Camp.

See also
 National service in Singapore

References

External links
 Opening of Basic Military Training Centre in Pulau Tekong
 About Basic Military Training

Military education and training in Singapore
North-Eastern Islands
Pulau Tekong
Buildings and structures in North-East Region, Singapore